is the title of a hentai anime directed by Satoshi Urushihara in 2004, based on his artbook Lady Innocent and was released in Japan under the title Front Innocent.

Plot 
During the Civil War, the powerful landowner Carson had a beautiful young daughter with an innocent heart, Faye. As Faye enjoys an intense sexual relationship with her friend John and her servant girl Sophia, the end of her innocent days draws near. The mysterious Lord Mark has set his eyes on her and will stop at nothing to get her.

Characters and Cast 
 - Voiced by Kumi Sakuma 
 - Voiced by Takamori Nao
 - Voiced by Kazuhiko Inoue
 - Voiced by Hiromi Hirata
 - Voiced by Shiho Kawaragi

Notes

Further reading 
Reviews
Mania
THEM Anime Reviews

External links 
 
Front Innocent Official JP
Front Innocent OVA 1 JP

2004 anime OVAs
Hentai anime and manga
Kitty Media